Ancient Paths Through Timeless Voids is the second full-length studio album by Cloak of Altering, independently released on October 30, 2012.

Track listing

Personnel
Adapted from Ancient Paths Through Timeless Voids liner notes.
 Maurice de Jong (as Mories) –  vocals, instruments, recording, cover art

Release history

References

External links 
 
 Ancient Paths Through Timeless Voids at Bandcamp

2012 albums
Cloak of Altering albums